Pyotr Yevgenyevich Shubin (born 21 February 1944) is a Russian professional football coach and a former player.

Career
Shubin managed FC SKA Rostov-on-Don in the Soviet Top League and Soviet First League and FC Dynamo Stavropol in the Russian First League before being appointed to replace the gravely ill Anatoli Polosin at Russian Top League club FC Shinnik Yaroslavl in August 1997.

References

External links
 

1944 births
Sportspeople from Chelyabinsk
Living people
Soviet footballers
FC Ural Yekaterinburg players
FC Alga Bishkek players
Soviet football managers
Soviet expatriate football managers
Expatriate football managers in Algeria
Russian football managers
Russian expatriate football managers
Expatriate football managers in the United Arab Emirates
FC Alga Bishkek managers
FC Rotor Volgograd managers
FC Dynamo Stavropol managers
FC Shinnik Yaroslavl managers
FC Anzhi Makhachkala managers
FC KAMAZ Naberezhnye Chelny managers
FC Dinamo Minsk managers
Russian Premier League managers
FC SKA Rostov-on-Don managers
Expatriate football managers in Belarus
Association football midfielders
FC Orenburg players
Soviet expatriate sportspeople in Algeria
Soviet expatriate sportspeople in the United Arab Emirates
Russian expatriate sportspeople in the United Arab Emirates
Russian expatriate sportspeople in Belarus